Michael Angelo Oliverio II (born August 6, 1963) is a State Senator for the 13th district and the 2010 Democratic nominee for U.S. Representative for . He previously served in the West Virginia House of Delegates.

Oliverio ran for his former State Senate district as a Republican in 2018, but lost to incumbent Bob Beach. In 2022, Oliverio ran again in the open 13th district after Beach retired, defeating delegate Barbara Fleischauer.

Early life, education and career
Oliverio was born August 6, 1963 in Fairmont, West Virginia. He served in the United States Army, where he achieved the rank of Captain.

Oliverio is currently employed as a financial planner for Northwestern Mutual.

West Virginia Legislature
Oliverio was first elected to public office representing the 44th House District (portions of Monongalia County) in 1992.  In 1994, he was elected to the 13th Senatorial District of the West Virginia. Reelected in 1998, 2002, and 2006, Oliverio served as the chairman of the Labor Committee and vice-chairman of the Judiciary Committee. One of Oliverio's legislative accomplishments was a change to the state constitution which allows West Virginia's state government to invest in stocks rather than just fixed-income securities as before.  Oliverio did not seek reelection in 2010 due to his candidacy for Congress.  His term ended in January 2011.

Political positions 
Oliverio is considered to be a Republican and has espoused issues such as reducing the national debt. He advocates government bans on abortion. In 2010 the anti-abortion group Susan B. Anthony List said "it spent $78,000 on the 1st District race and made 80,000 prerecorded calls on Oliverio's behalf Monday and Tuesday. The results, it said, should serve as a warning to other incumbents." 

Along with Delegate Jonathan Miller, a Republican, he served as the state co-chair of the American Legislative Exchange Council (ALEC).  Oliverio was also thanked in a 2006 speech by President George W. Bush for his assistance in securing the confirmation of Samuel Alito to the United States Supreme Court. 

On March 20, 2010, West Virginia Republican Party chair Doug McKinney referred to Oliverio's conservative political leanings by saying, "Sen. Oliverio has always been a conservative guy. He votes with the Republican on committees. We've joked for years he needs to come over to the party who thinks like he does."

2010 U.S. Congressional campaign

On February 1, 2010, Oliverio announced his candidacy for West Virginia's 1st congressional district seat. He defeated 14-term incumbent Alan Mollohan in the Democratic primary on May 11, 2010. Oliverio lost to David McKinley by an extremely narrow margin. He indicated his concerns about the national debt served as the primary impetus for his campaign. Olivero announced his interest in entering the 2012 Congressional race to face David McKinley, but ultimately decided not to run.

Personal life
Oliverio resides in Morgantown, West Virginia with his wife and two children. His father, Michael Angelo Oliverio (Mike Oliverio, Sr.) was a former Monongalia County clerk.

References

External links
 
 Campaign contributions at OpenSecrets.org

1963 births
Living people
West Virginia University alumni
West Virginia Republicans
West Virginia Democrats
Politicians from Morgantown, West Virginia
Politicians from Fairmont, West Virginia
Military personnel from West Virginia
American people of Italian descent
West Virginia state senators
Candidates in the 2010 United States elections
21st-century American politicians
Members of the West Virginia House of Delegates